Richard Freer (born 1953) is a leading American academic in civil procedure and the Robert Howell Hall Professor of Law at Emory University School of Law in Atlanta, Georgia.  He has written numerous articles and has published 11 books during his career.  Currently, his book on civil procedure is the preferred text on the subject at many law schools throughout the country.  Freer is also a member of the Barbri staff and has lectured for Barbri for over thirty years.

Education 

Freer graduated in 1975 from the University of California, San Diego with highest honors and four intercollegiate athletic letters in both baseball and tennis. He graduated from UCLA School of Law in 1978. While at UCLA, he was elected to Order of the Coif, was a member of the UCLA Law Review, and graduated 5th in his class.

Professional career 

Upon graduation, he clerked first for Chief Judge Edward Schwartz of the United States District Court for the Southern District of California from 1978 to 1979, and then Judge Clement Haynsworth of the United States Court of Appeals for the Fourth Circuit from 1979 to 1980. After clerking, Freer joined the litigation group of the Los Angeles firm of Gibson, Dunn & Crutcher. He joined the Emory faculty in 1983 and has served as visiting professor at George Washington University and at Central European University in Budapest. The student body has named him Outstanding Professor nine times. The Black Law Students Association has named him Professor of the Year five times. The university recognized him with its Scholar/Teacher Award in 2008, and he is a recipient of the university’s highest teaching award, the Emory Williams Award for Excellence in Teaching. He has also received Emory Law’s triennial Ben F. Johnson Award for Faculty Excellence.

Areas of specialty: civil procedure, complex litigation, and business associations.

Research and scholarship: Freer is author or co-author of 16 books, including his Treatise on Civil Procedure (2d ed. 2009), the widely adopted Freer & Perdue casebook on civil procedure (5th ed. 2008) and a popular casebook on business structures (2d ed. 2007). He is the only academic to serve as contributing author to both of the standard multivolume treatises on federal jurisdiction and practice: Moore’s Federal Practice and Wright & Miller’s Federal Practice and Procedure. He has written widely regarded articles in various areas of federal jurisdiction and procedure, and served as an adviser to the American Law Institute’s Federal Judicial Code Project. He is a national bar review lecturer on civil procedure, federal jurisdiction, and corporations, and lectures annually to tens of thousands of bar candidates and law students. He served for six years on the university’s President's Advisory Committee and was the university’s vice provost in 1991. Following his tenure as vice provost, Freer purchased three Wendy's franchises in Delaware.

References

American legal scholars
Living people
1953 births
Emory University faculty
People associated with Gibson Dunn